In business analysis, PEST analysis ("political, economic, socio-cultural and technological") describes a framework of macro-environmental factors used in the environmental scanning component of strategic management. It is part of an external environment analysis when conducting a strategic analysis or doing market research, and gives an overview of the different macro-environmental factors to be taken into consideration. It is a strategic tool for understanding market growth or decline, business position, potential and direction for operations.

PEST analysis was developed in 1967 by Aguilar as an environmental scanning framework. Aguilar argued that firms must scan the economic, technical, political and social categories (ETPS) that may affect strategy, defining environmental scanning as follows, “scanning for information about events and relationships in a company’s outside environment, the knowledge of which would assist top management in its task of charting the company’s future course of action.”

Composition 
The basic PEST analysis includes four factors:
 Political factors relate to how the government intervenes in the economy. Specifically, political factors have areas including tax policy, labour law, environmental law, trade restrictions, tariffs, and political stability. Political factors may also include goods and services which the government aims to provide or be provided (merit goods) and those that the government does not want to be provided (demerit goods or merit bads). Furthermore, governments have a high impact on the health, education, and infrastructure of a nation.
 Economic factors include economic growth, exchange rates, inflation rate, and interest rates. These factors can drastically affect how a business operates. For example, interest rates affect a firm's cost of capital and therefore to what extent a business grows and expands. 
 Social factors include the cultural aspects and health consciousness, population growth rate, age distribution, career attitudes and emphasis on safety. High trends in social factors affect the demand for a company's products and how that company operates. For example, the ageing population may imply a smaller and less-willing workforce (thus increasing the cost of labour). Furthermore, companies may change various management strategies to adapt to social trends caused from this (such as recruiting older workers).
 Technological factors include technological aspects like R&D activity, automation, technology incentives and the rate of technological change. These can determine barriers to entry, minimum efficient production level and influence the outsourcing decisions. Furthermore, technological shifts would affect costs, quality, and lead to innovation

Variants 
Variants that build on the PEST framework include:
 PESTEL or PESTLE, which adds legal and environmental factors. Legal factors include discrimination law, consumer law, antitrust law, employment law, and health and safety law, which can affect how a company operates, its costs, and the demand for its products. Environmental factors include ecological and environmental aspects such as weather, climate, and climate change, which may especially affect industries such as tourism, farming, and insurance. For instance, growing awareness of the potential impacts of climate change is affecting how companies operate and the products they offer, both creating new markets and diminishing or destroying existing ones. Further, the PESTLE analysis is one of the most frequently applied models in the evaluation of the highly dynamic external business environment. It is employed as a method in research due to its usefulness. For example. a growing number of studies applied this analytical tool in different sustainable projects, including the evaluation of external factors affecting management decisions for coastal zone and freshwater resources,  development of sustainable buildings, sustainable energy solutions,  and transportation.
 ETPS economic, technical, political and social.
 SLEPT, adding legal factors.
 STEPE, adding ecological factors.
 STEEP, including environmental factors.
 STEEPLE and STEEPLED, adding ethics and demographic factors (occasionally rendered as PESTLEE). Demographic factors include gender, age, ethnicity, knowledge of languages, disabilities, mobility, home ownership, employment status, religious belief or practice, culture and tradition, living standards and income level.
 DESTEP, adding demographic and ecological factors.
 SPELIT, adding legal and intercultural factors. Intercultural factors considers collaboration in a global setting. Other factors discussed in chapter 10 of the SPELIT Power Matrix include the Ethical, Educational, Physical, Religious, and Security environments.
PMESII-PT, a form of environmental analysis which looks at the aspects of political, military, economic, social, information, infrastructure, physical environment and time aspects in a military context.
STEER considers sociocultural, technological, economic, ecological, and regulatory factors, but does not specifically include political factors.
TELOS framework explores Technical, Economic, Legal, Operational, and Scheduling factors.

Applicability of the factors 
The model's factors will vary in importance to a given company based on its industry and the goods it produces. For example, consumer and B2B companies tend to be more affected by the social factors, while a global defense contractor would tend to be more affected by political factors. Additionally, factors that are more likely to change in the future or more relevant to a given company will carry greater importance. For example, a company which has borrowed heavily will need to focus more on the economic factors (especially interest rates). Furthermore, conglomerate companies who produce a wide range of products (such as Sony, Disney, or BP) may find it more useful to analyze one department of its company at a time with the PESTEL model, thus focusing on the specific factors relevant to that one department. A company may also wish to divide factors into geographical relevance, such as local, national, and global.

Limitations 
Whereas the PEST analysis is broadly used in business practice, critics argue that it has limitations. PEST analysis can be helpful to explain market changes in the past, but it is not always suitable to predict or foresee upcoming market changes. The reason is that PEST analysis offers a broad range of categories that can be deceivingly simple because they lack specific criteria about what exactly catalyses disruption. In other words, the PEST analysis does not offer guidelines for what to emphasise and what not to emphasise within the categories. As a result, firms can be blindsided by disruptions that cannot be neatly defined within the categories.

See also 
 Enterprise planning systems
 Macromarketing
 SWOT analysis (strengths, weaknesses, opportunities, threats), a method for strategic planning analysis comparing positive and negative factors
 VRIO (value, rarity, imitability, organization), a strategic business analysis framework

References

External links 
 PEST Analysis, discusses how a PEST analysis can help determine the risks and opportunities associated with entering a foreign market.

Strategic management
Management theory
Analysis